The Scotland women's national under-17 football team, also known as Scotland under-17s or Scotland U17(s), represents Scotland in association football at an under-17 age level and is controlled by the Scottish Football Association, the governing body for football in Scotland.

The team qualified for the 2014 UEFA Women's Under-17 Championship in England following a 2–0 defeat of Finland in the qualifying stage held in Hungary in October 2013. For the European tournament, to be played in November and December 2013, they were drawn in Group B with Germany, Spain and France.

UEFA Women's Under-17 Championship

References

External links 
 SFA article
 Coach's comments

F
Women's national under-17 association football teams